Alberto Chiesa (born 25 February 1988) is an Italian rugby player. He represents Cavalieri Prato, with double role of player and coach, after the experience with Rugby Calvisano, an Italian rugby union club in rugby union club matches. 

In 2012-2013 season he played for Zebre.

References

External links 

1988 births
Living people
People from Livorno
Italian rugby union players
Cavalieri Prato players
Zebre Parma players
Rugby Calvisano players
Rugby union fullbacks